"Sharayah" is a 1985 single by Christian music singer Amy Grant. It was released as the fourth and final single from her Unguarded album. The song did not achieve the mainstream success that the previous Unguarded singles had seen but still emerged as a major hit on Christian radio.

"Sharayah" is an uptempo, rock-styled inspirational song that features heavy use of the synthesizer and electric guitar. In the song, Grant addresses a close friend named Sharayah, a presumably fictional character who is experiencing a crisis of faith. Grant implores her friend to find salvation in God. However, the lyrics do not specifically mention God or Jesus.

Music video
Unlike "Find a Way" and "Wise Up", Grant's record label did not release a music video in support of "Sharayah".

Background
The lead single from Unguarded was "Find A Way". That song went No. 1 on the Christian music charts, but also gave Grant her first hit on pop radio (as well as the first-ever Contemporary Christian music song to chart on pop radio). The next two singles, "Everywhere I Go" and "Wise Up", continued Grant's newfound mainstream success and were released to both Christian and mainstream pop radio. "Sharayah" is similar to the previous singles in that it bears a distinctively 1980s pop/rock sound with inspirational lyrics. In 1986, Grant released her first compilation album, The Collection. Both "Find A Way" and "Everywhere I Go" were included, but neither "Wise Up" nor "Sharayah" made the cut. Grant included "Sharayah" on her next major tour after Unguarded, the Lead Me On World Tour, in 1988–89. In the years since, however, "Sharayah" has not endured as a staple of Grant's catalog and is rarely included in her concert set lists. To date, the song has not been included on any of Amy Grant's official compilation or "best of" collections.

Chart Success

"Sharayah" was a hit on Christian radio, peaking at No. 2 on the Christian charts in the U.S. All four of Grant's singles from Unguarded were Top 5 Christian radio hits, with "Sharayah" tied as the second most successful Christian single from the album with Wise Up. However, the single did not chart on either The Billboard Hot 100 or the mainstream Adult Contemporary chart—the only song released from Unguarded to not crack the mainstream charts.

Personnel 
 Amy Grant – lead vocals
 Shane Keister – synthesizers
 Jon Goin – electric guitar 
 Dann Huff – electric guitar
 Michael Landau – electric guitar
 Mike Brignardello – bass 
 Paul Leim – drums
 Richard Page – backing vocals 
 Steve George – backing vocals 
 Tom Kelly –  backing vocals

Charts

Sharayah
Sharayah
Songs written by Amy Grant
Songs written by Chris Eaton (UK musician)
1985 songs
A&M Records singles
Word Records singles